Mawby is a surname. Notable people with the surname include:

Colin Mawby (1936–2019), English organist, choral conductor and composer
Raymond Llewellyn Mawby (1922 – 1990), British politician
Russell Mawby (born 1928), American academic and philanthropist
The Mawby Triplets, three English sisters who were child actors